Epidendrum cylindraceum  is a reed-stemmed Epidendrum of the Orchidaceae, native to Colombia, Ecuador, and Peru, where it has been reported at an altitude of 3.2 km.

Description 
Epidendrum cylindraceum stems are completely covered with tubular sheathes which bear one to two ovate-oblong leaves near the apex.  The peduncle is clothed in two or three elongate herbaceous sheathes, arranged in a fan.  The inflorescence is a dense raceme, up to 15 cm long by 5 cm in diameter.  The rather small, non-resupinate, mostly white flowers have obovate acute sepals nearly 1 cm long that are rough on the outside, and linear petals.  The deeply trilobate lip is adnate to the column to its apex:  the small lateral lobes are sickle-shaped, with slight fringing on the proximal edge, and the much larger central lobe is kidney-shaped at its apex.

References

External links 
 The Internet Orchid Species Photo Encyclopedia
 http://www.rv-orchidworks.com/orchidtalk/orchid-shows-society-meetings/16433-fascination-orchids-show-photos.html

cylindraceum
Orchids of Colombia
Orchids of Ecuador
Orchids of Peru